Acalypha villicaulis is a species in the botanical family Euphorbiaceae. In tropical Africa it is widely used as a medicinal plant.

Geographic distribution 
Acalypha villicaulis occurs throughout tropical Africa, except humid central Africa.

Synonyms 
 Acalypha brachiata C.Krauss
 Acalypha petiolaris Hochst. ex C.Krauss
 Acalypha senensis Klotzsch

References

External links 
PROTA4U on Acalypha villicaulis

villicaulis
Plants used in traditional African medicine